Alpha Comae Berenices (α Comae Berenices, abbreviated Alpha Com, α Com) is a binary star in the constellation of Coma Berenices (Berenice's Hair),  away.  It consists of two main sequence stars, each a little hotter and more luminous than the Sun.

Alpha Comae Berenices is said to represent the crown worn by Queen Berenice.  The two components are designated Alpha Comae Berenices A (officially named Diadem , the traditional name for the system) and B.

Nomenclature 

α Comae Berenices (Latinised to Alpha Comae Berenices) is the system's Bayer designation. The designations of the two components as Alpha Comae Berenices A and B derive from the convention used by the Washington Multiplicity Catalog (WMC) for multiple star systems, and adopted by the International Astronomical Union (IAU).

The system bore the traditional names Diadem and Al Dafirah, the latter derived from the Arabic الضفيرة ađ̧-đ̧afīrah "the braid". In 2016, the International Astronomical Union organized a Working Group on Star Names (WGSN) to catalogue and standardize proper names for stars. The WGSN decided to attribute proper names to individual stars rather than entire multiple systems. It approved the name Diadem for the component Alpha Comae Berenices A on 1 February 2017 and it is now so included in the List of IAU-approved Star Names.

Properties

Although Alpha Comae Berenices bears the title "alpha", at magnitude 4.32 it is actually fainter than Beta Comae Berenices.

It is a binary star, with almost equal components of magnitudes 5.05 m and 5.08 m orbiting each other with a period of 25.87 years. The system, estimated to be 58 light-years distant, appears so nearly "edge-on" from the Earth that the two stars appear to move back-and-forth in a straight line with a maximum separation of only 0.7 arcsec. Eclipses are predicted to occur between the two components however they have not been successfully observed due to miscalculations of the time of eclipse.

The mean separation between them is approximately 10 AU, about the distance between the Sun and Saturn.

The binary star has a visual companion, CCDM J13100+1732C, of apparent magnitude 10.2, located 89 arcseconds away along a position angle of 345°.

Alpha Comae Berenicis forms an isosceles triangle with globular star clusters Messier 53 and NGC 5053. The apparent diameter of this triangle is a little more than one degree. The location of Alpha Comae Berenicis is westward (preceding) of both globular star clusters.

References

External links 

Comae Berenices, Alpha
Binary stars
Coma Berenices
F-type main-sequence stars
Diadem
Comae Berenices, 42
114378
064241
Triple stars
BD+18 2697
0501
4968